Huta Stara  is a small village in the administrative district of Gmina Krasocin, within Włoszczowa County, Świętokrzyskie Voivodeship, in south-central Poland.

The village has a population of 39.

References

Huta Stara